Endgame: The Blueprint for Victory in the War on Terror (2004) is a book by Lt.General Thomas McInerney, US Air Force, and Major General Paul E. Vallely, US Army, with forward remarks by CIA Director James Woolsey. It describes a super secret weapon system that is intended to neutralize nuclear weapons.

" I call upon the scientific community in our country, those who gave us nuclear weapons, to turn their talents now to the cause of mankind and world peace, to give us the means of rendering those weapons impotent and obsolete."—President Ronald Reagan, Address to the Nation, March 23, 1983

The book states:

See also
 Mutual assured destruction
 Brinkmanship

Nuclear warfare
Military books
2004 non-fiction books